Aladdin Knowledge Systems (formerly  and ) was a company that produced software for digital rights management and Internet security. The company was acquired by Safenet Inc, in 2009. Its corporate headquarters are located in Belcamp, MD.

History
Aladdin Knowledge Systems was founded in 1985 by Jacob (Yanki) Margalit, when he was 23 years old; he was soon joined by his brother Dany Margalit, who took the responsibility for product development at the age of 18, while at the same time completing a Mathematics and Computer Science degree at Tel Aviv University. In its early years the company developed two product lines, an artificial intelligence package (which was dropped early on) and a hardware product to prevent unauthorized software copying, similar to digital rights management. Margalit raised just $10,000 as an initial capital for the company.

The digital rights management product became a success and by 1993 generated sales of $4,000,000. The same year that company had an initial public offering on NASDAQ raising $7,900,000. In 2004 the company's shares were also listed on the Tel Aviv Stock Exchange. By 2007 the company's annual revenues reached over $105 million. 
   
In mid-2008, Vector Capital was attempting to purchase Aladdin. Vector initially offered $14.50 per share, but Aladdin's founder Margalit refused the offer arguing that the company was worth more. Aladdin's shareholders agreed on the merger in February 2009 at $11.50 per share, in cash. In March 2009, Vector Capital acquired Aladdin and officially merged it with SafeNet.

Corporate timeline
 1985 – Aladdin Knowledge Systems was established
 1993 – Aladdin held an initial public offering
 1996 – Aladdin acquired the German company FAST
 1998 – Aladdin patented USB smart card-based authentication tokens
 1998_Dec – Aladdin acquired the software protection business of EliaShim
 1999 – Aladdin acquired the eSafe "content security" business of EliaShim
 2000 – Aladdin acquired 10% of Comsec
 2001 – Aladdin acquired the ESD assets of Preview Systems
 2005 – Aladdin completed second offering – 2,000,000 shares with net proceeds of $39m
 2009 – Aladdin was acquired by Vector Capital.
 2010 – Aladdin was merged with Vector Capital's SafeNet.

Products

DRM

Aladdin's  HASP product line is a digital rights management (DRM) suite of protection and licensing software with 40% global market share, used by over 30,000 software publishers.

HASP, which stands for Hardware Against Software Piracy, was the company's first product and evolved into a complete digital rights management suite, that includes a software only option and a back office management application, in recent years also software as a service capability.

Internet security
In the late 1990s the company started diversifying and began offering Internet security and network security products, offering two product lines:

Digital identity management

eToken, portable device for two-factor authentication, pasdigital identity management, mainly deployed as a USB token.

Network security
eSafe a line of integrated network security and content filtering products, protecting networks against cracked   and pirated Internet-borne software.

See also
 Product activation
 License manager
 List of license managers
 Floating licensing
 Silicon Wadi

References

External links
 SafeNet Inc. Data Protection & Software Licensing website
 Content Security – eSafe
 eToken PASS – Aladdin Product
 Aladdin Knowledge Systems website

Information technology companies of Israel
Computer security software companies
Copyright enforcement companies
Software licenses
Digital rights management
Companies based in Petah Tikva
Companies formerly listed on the Nasdaq
Software companies established in 1985
1985 establishments in Israel